is a Japanese historian and emeritus professor of Shizuoka University.

Owada graduated from Waseda University. His work focuses on the studies of history and castles in the Sengoku period of Japan. He is especially famous for his research into the Imagawa clan and Later Hōjō clan. He often works as a historical consultant for the Taiga drama series and makes television appearances on NHK.

Selected published works
  (1972)
  (1983)
  (1983)
  (1990)
  (1996)
  (2000) (Gakken)
  (2006) (Kadokawa)
  (2007) (Gakken)
  (2013)
  (2014)
  (2015)
  (2015)
  (2015)
  (2015) (Gentosha)
  (2016)
  (2020)

See also 
 Japanese castle
 Yoshihiro Senda

References

External links 
Tetsuo Owada Official cite

1944 births
Living people
20th-century Japanese historians
21st-century Japanese historians